Osteochilus striatus is a species of cyprinid fish endemic to Laos.

References

Taxa named by Maurice Kottelat
Fish described in 1998
Osteochilus